Wiehenvenator is a genus of megalosaurid theropod dinosaur from the Middle Jurassic (Callovian) of north western Germany. The genus contains a single species, W. albati.

Discovery and naming

In 1998, geologist Friedrich Albat, prospecting for the Landschaftsverband Westfalen-Lippe Museum of Natural History, discovered the remains of a large theropod at the abandoned Pott quarry in the Wiehen Hills near Minden, Westphalia. The remains were discovered within the Ornatenton Formation, a geological formation composed mainly of mudstone, sandstones, and a horizon of carbonate concretions. The fragmentary theropod skeleton, found alongside abundant marine invertebrates and fossilized wood, was excavated between October 1998 and October 2001. At the time of their discovery, the bones were heavily weathered out of the surrounding sediments and are somewhat poorly preserved. The numerous breaks and cracks found in the material risked being destroyed upon removal from the matrix, and so led the excavation team to instead extract them into jackets that were then later prepared in the laboratories of the LWL Museum für Naturkunde.

The find received extensive press attention and was informally known as Das Monster von Minden (the Minden Monster). Reports in the German edition of the National Geographic of a rib 50% larger than that of Allosaurus stirred speculations that it reached  in length.

In 2015, it was announced that the find had been identified as a new species of megalosaurid. In 2016, the fossils were named and described as the type species Wiehenvenator albati by Oliver W. M. Rauhut, Tom R. Hübner and Klaus-Peter Lanser. The generic name combines a reference to the Wiehengebirge, the German name of the Wiehen Hills, with a Latin venator ("hunter"). The specific name honours Friedrich Albat, the discoverer. As the name was published in an electronic publication, Life Science Identifiers were needed for its validity. These were 95638CFF-5618-4D31-9086-D821F6EE6B39 for the genus and 262FA776-9ABC-4565-9A17-931CB4BEFBFC for the species.

A megalosauroid pedal phalanx ((WMNM P27698, P27693) from the Ornatenton Formation discovered in two parts during October 1999 and April 2000 may have belonged to the holotype of W. albati.

Description
 
The type specimen of Wiehenvenator consists of an assortment of bones found in the Ornatenton Formation dating from the middle Callovian. They include parts of the skull (right premaxilla, right maxilla, right lacrimal bone, right postorbital and possible front branch of the right quadratojugal), the anterior parts of a right lower jaw (dentary), six teeth, three tail vertebrae, a pair of fused median segments of rear gastralia, one complete rib and four rib fragments, a finger phalanx, both fibulae, a right astragalus and a right calcaneum. All these bones were seen as belonging to a single individual. Two additional tail vertebrae may also belong to it. Histological analysis of its fibulae suggests that the holotype of Wiehenvenator albati was at least in its ninth year of life, however, the age at death might have been well over ten years. The remains indicated that the animal was actively growing, but narrow growth zones indicated that the skeletal growth rate was slowing down. From this it can be determined that the growth state of Wiehenvenator was that of a large subadult individual.

Classification
In 2016, Wiehenvenator was placed in the Megalosauridae as a sister taxon to Torvosaurus. The following is a cladogram based on the phylogenetic analysis conducted by Rauhut et al., showing the relationships of Wiehenvenator.

Paleoecology

After discovering the initial remains of Wiehenvenator, members of the excavation team returned to the site and continued to search the surroundings for further material. After searching 35m both east and west of the Ornatenton Formation, some weathered vertebral centra and teeth of Liopleurodon were found. One year later, in mid-October 1999, the remains consisting of a maxillary fragment, bone fragments, and a tooth, of a second theropod were found 28.5 m north-west of the first locality. On October 3, 2014, in an overgrown quarry to the west, the skull and lower jaws of the crocodylomorph Metriorhynchus were discovered by an honorary member of the LWL Museum für Naturkunde. These multiple discoveries imply a potential for more material to be found in the future.

See also 
 2016 in paleontology

References

External links 
 "Wiehenvenator albati, Das Monster von Minden" on Earth Archives Website
 "Paleo Profile: The Monster of Minden" at Scientific American Website

Megalosaurs
Callovian life
Middle Jurassic dinosaurs of Europe
Jurassic Germany
Fossils of Germany
Fossil taxa described in 2016